The Zarankiewicz problem, an unsolved problem in mathematics, asks for the largest possible number of edges in a bipartite graph that has a given number of vertices and has no complete bipartite subgraphs of a given size. It belongs to the field of extremal graph theory, a branch of combinatorics, and is named after the Polish mathematician Kazimierz Zarankiewicz, who proposed several special cases of the problem in 1951.

Problem statement
No two edges can both connect the same pair of vertices. A complete bipartite graph in which  has  vertices and  has  vertices is denoted .

The Zarankiewicz problem asks for a formula for the Zarankiewicz function, or (failing that) for tight asymptotic bounds on the growth rate of  assuming that  is a fixed constant, in the limit as  goes to infinity.

For  this problem is the same as determining cages with girth six. The Zarankiewicz problem, cages and finite geometry are strongly interrelated.

The same problem can also be formulated in terms of digital geometry. The possible edges of a bipartite graph  can be visualized as the points of a  rectangle in the integer lattice, and a complete subgraph is a set of rows and columns in this rectangle in which all points are present. Thus,  denotes the maximum number of points that can be placed within an  grid in such a way that no subset of rows and columns forms a complete  grid. An alternative and equivalent definition is that  is the smallest integer  such that every (0,1)-matrix of size  with  ones must have a set of  rows and  columns such that the corresponding  submatrix is made up only of 1's.

Examples

The number  asks for the maximum number of edges in a bipartite graph with  vertices on each side that has no 4-cycle (its girth is six or more).

In the other direction, if a bipartite graph with 14 edges has four vertices on each side, then two vertices on each side must have degree four. Removing these four vertices and their 12 incident edges leaves a nonempty set of edges, any of which together with the four removed vertices forms a  subgraph.

Upper bounds

The Kővári–Sós–Turán theorem provides an upper bound on the solution to the Zarankiewicz problem. It was established by Tamás Kővári, Vera T. Sós and Pál Turán shortly after the problem had been posed:

Shortly afterwards, Hyltén-Cavallius observed that essentially the same argument can be used to prove the above inequality.

;
.
In the particular case , assuming without loss of generality that , we have the asymptotic upper bound

Lower bounds

Therefore, if one can show a lower bound for  that matches the upper bound up to a constant, then by a simple sampling argument (on either an  bipartite graph or an  bipartite graph that achieves the maximum edge number), we can show that for all , one of the above two upper bounds is tight up to a constant.
? 

In one direction, a bipartite graph with  vertices on each side and  edges must have a subgraph with  vertices and at least  edges; this can be seen from choosing  vertices uniformly at random from each side, and taking the expectation. Same as above, with the convention that , it has been conjectured that

At the same time, the answer to the general question is still unknown to us.

Incidence graphs in finite geometry

For , a bipartite graph with  vertices on each side,  edges, and no  may be obtained as the Levi graph, or point-line incidence graph, of a projective plane of order , a system of  points and  lines in which each two points determine a unique line, and each two lines intersect at a unique point. We construct a  bipartite graph associated to this projective plane that has one vertex part as its points, the other vertex part as its lines, such that a point and a line is connected if and only if they are incident in the projective plane. This leads to a -free graph with  vertices and  edges. 
Since this lower bound matches the upper bound given by I. Reiman, we have the asymptotic 

For , bipartite graphs with  vertices on each side,  edges, and no  may again be constructed from finite geometry, by letting the vertices represent points and spheres (of a carefully chosen fixed radius) in a three-dimensional finite affine space, and letting the edges represent point-sphere incidences.

More generally, consider  and any . Let  be the -element finite field, and  be an element of multiplicative order , in the sense that  form a -element subgroup of the multiplicative group . Hence we have the upper bound

Norm graphs and projective norm graphs

and Alon, Rónyai, and Szabó

using the construction of norm graphs and projective norm graphs over finite fields.

For , consider the norm graph NormGraphp,s with vertex set , such that every two vertices  are connected if and only if , where  is the norm map

It is not hard to verify that the graph has  vertices and at least  edges. To see that this graph is -free, observe that any common neighbor  of  vertices  must satisfy

for all , which a system of equations that has at most  solutions.

The same result can be proved for all  using the projective norm graph, a construction slightly stronger than the above. By a similar argument to the above, one can verify that it is a  -free graph with  edges.

To see that  is  -free, consider  tuples . Observe that if the  tuples have a common neighbor, then the  must be distinct. Using the same upper bound on he number of solutions to the system of equations, we know that these  tuples have at most  common neighbors.

Clique partitions

Using a related result on clique partition numbers, Alon, Mellinger, Mubayi and Verstraëte 
.
For , we say that a collection of subsets 
 is a clique partition of  if  form a partition of 
.

It remains to show that such a clique partition exists for any . Let  be the collection of all , so that  and every  has size . Clearly no two members of  can share  members.

Randomized algebraic constructions

and by Bukh 
using the method of random algebraic constructions. The basic idea is to take a random polynomial  and consider the graph  between two copies of  whose edges are all those pairs  such that .

Let

For every -subset , we let  denote the vertex subset of  that "vanishes on ":
. 
.
If we remove a vertex from every such , then the resulting graph is  free, and the expected number of remaining edges is still large.

Applications
The Kővári–Sós–Turán theorem has been used in discrete geometry to bound the number of incidences between geometric objects of various types. As a simple example, a set of  points and  lines in the Euclidean plane necessarily has no , so by the Kővári–Sós–Turán it has  point-line incidences. However, the Szemerédi–Trotter theorem may be proven by dividing the points and lines into subsets for which the Kővári–Sós–Turán bound is tight.

See also
Biclique-free graph, sparse graphs whose sparsity is controlled by the solution to the Zarankiewicz problem
Forbidden subgraph problem, a non-bipartite generalization of the Zarankiewicz problem
Forbidden graph characterization, families of graphs defined by forbidden subgraphs of various types
Turán's theorem, a bound on the number of edges of a graph with a forbidden complete subgraph

References

Extremal graph theory
Mathematical problems
Unsolved problems in graph theory
Bipartite graphs